Rajamunda is a village in the state of Odisha, India.

References

Villages in Sundergarh district